The 23rd Golden Globe Awards, honoring the best in film and television for 1965, were held on 28 February 1966.

Winners and nominees

Film

Best Film - Drama
 Doctor Zhivago
The Collector
The Flight of the Phoenix
A Patch of Blue
Ship of Fools

Best Film - Comedy or Musical
 The Sound of Music
Cat Ballou
The Great Race
Those Magnificent Men in their Flying Machines
A Thousand Clowns

Best Actor - Drama
 Omar Sharif - Doctor Zhivago
Rex Harrison - The Agony and the Ecstasy
Sidney Poitier - A Patch of Blue
Rod Steiger - The Pawnbroker
Oskar Werner - Ship of Fools

Best Actress - Drama
 Samantha Eggar - The Collector
Julie Christie - Darling
Elizabeth Hartman - A Patch of Blue
Simone Signoret - Ship of Fools
Maggie Smith - Othello

Best Actor - Comedy or Musical
 Lee Marvin - Cat Ballou
Jack Lemmon - The Great Race
Jerry Lewis - Boeing Boeing
Jason Robards - A Thousand Clowns
Alberto Sordi - Those Magnificent Men in their Flying Machines

Best Actress - Comedy or Musical
 Julie Andrews – The Sound of Music
Jane Fonda – Cat Ballou
Barbara Harris – A Thousand Clowns
Rita Tushingham – The Knack ...and How to Get It
Natalie Wood – Inside Daisy Clover

Best Supporting Actor
 Oskar Werner - The Spy Who Came in from the Cold
Red Buttons - Harlow
Frank Finlay - Othello
Hardy Krüger - The Flight of the Phoenix
Telly Savalas - Battle of the Bulge

Best Supporting Actress
 Ruth Gordon - Inside Daisy Clover
Joan Blondell - The Cincinnati Kid
Joyce Redman - Othello
Thelma Ritter - Boeing Boeing
Peggy Wood - The Sound of Music

Best Director
 David Lean - Doctor Zhivago
Guy Green - A Patch of Blue
John Schlesinger - Darling
Robert Wise - The Sound of Music
William Wyler - The Collector

Best Screenplay
 Doctor Zhivago − Robert Bolt
The Agony and the Ecstasy − Philip Dunne 
The Collector − John Kohn and Stanley Mann   
A Patch of Blue − Guy Green 
The Slender Thread − Stirling Silliphant

Best Foreign Film (English language)
 Darling
The Knack ...and How to Get It
The Leather Boys
Ninety Degrees in the Shade
Othello

Best Foreign Film (Foreign language)
 Juliet of the Spirits (Giulietta degli spiriti), Italy
Always Further On (Tarahumara, cada vez más lejos), Mexico
Circle of Love (La ronde), France
Red Beard (Akahige), Japan
The Umbrellas of Cherbourg (Les parapluies de Cherbourg), France

Best Music, Original Score
 "Doctor Zhivago" - Maurice Jarre
"Battle of the Bulge" - Benjamin Frankel
"The Great Race" - Henry Mancini
"The Sandpiper" - Johnny Mandel
"The Yellow Rolls-Royce" -Riz Ortolani

Best Original Song
 "Forget Domani" - The Yellow Rolls-Royce
"Ballad of Cat Ballou" - Cat Ballou
"The Shadow of Your Smile" - The Sandpiper
"The Sweetheart Tree" - The Great Race
"That Funny Feeling" - That Funny Feeling

Television

Best TV Show
 The Man from U.N.C.L.E.
Frank Sinatra: A Man and His Music
Get Smart
I Spy
My Name is Barbra

Best TV Star - Male
 David Janssen - The Fugitive
Don Adams - Get Smart
Ben Gazzara - Run for Your Life
David McCallum - The Man from U.N.C.L.E.
Robert Vaughn - The Man from U.N.C.L.E.

Best TV Star - Female
 Anne Francis - Honey West
Patty Duke - The Patty Duke Show
Mia Farrow - Peyton Place
Dorothy Malone - Peyton Place
Barbara Stanwyck - The Big Valley

Award breakdown

Film
Winners (minimum 1 win)
5 / 5 Doctor Zhivago: Best Actor and Film - Drama, Best Director, Best Original Score & Best Screenplay
2 / 4 The Sound of Music: Best Actress and Film - Musical or Comedy
1 / 1 The Spy Who Came in from the Cold: Best Supporting Actor
1 / 2 Inside Daisy Clover: Best Supporting Actress
1 / 2 The Yellow Rolls-Royce: Best Original Song
1 / 4 Cat Ballou: Best Actor - Musical or Comedy
1 / 4 The Collector: Best Actress - Drama

Nominees (minimum 2 nominations)
0 / 2 Boeing Boeing
0 / 2 The Knack ...and How to Get It
0 / 3 Those Magnificent Men in their Flying Machines
0 / 3 A Thousand Clowns
0 / 4 The Great Race
0 / 4 Othello

References
IMdb 1966 Golden Globe Awards

023
1965 film awards
1965 television awards
1965 awards in the United States
February 1966 events in the United States